This is a list of Tennessee Volunteers selected in the NFL Draft.

Key

Players

References

Tennessee
Tennessee Volunteers football players
Tennessee Volunteers NFL Draft